Kadiyam Srihari (born 8 July 1952) is an Indian politician who served as the  Deputy Chief Minister of Telangana and Minister for Education of Telangana  from 2014 to December 2018. Currently he is MLC in Telangana legislative council since 22 November 2021 till date. He was a former Member of Parliament from Warangal constituency from the State of Telangana (2014-2015). He also worked as Minister in the cabinets of Nandamuri Taraka Rama Rao and Nara Chandrababu Naidu and represented Ghanpur (Station) constituency as an MLA. He worked as the Politburo member of Telugu Desam Party and the General Secretary of Telugu Desam Party.

Kadiyam served as Minister of undivided Andhra Pradesh from 1995 to 2004 in Marketing, Social Welfare later Education and later Irrigation under the Cabinet of Nara Chandrababu Naidu. He joined Telangana Rashtra Samithi party and is its politburo member. He took oath as a cabinet minister in Telangana government on 25 January 2015 as a Deputy Chief Minister and also Education Minister.

Early life
Kadiyam Srihari was born in Parvathagiri, a village in the Warangal district. He attended Zilla Parishad High School in Warangal and, then was awarded a B.Sc. from the Arts and Science College in the same city. In 1975, he got a M.Sc. from Osmania University, Hyderabad.

Career
Srihari began his professional career as a manager for Syndicate Bank in Nizamabad, where he worked between 1975-77. He then became a teacher, working as a junior lecturer between 1977-1987. During this period, he served as the District President for the Government Junior Lecturers Association in Warangal and also as the State Secretary for the same body in Andhra Pradesh.

He entered politics in February 1987 when he was asked by Nandamuri Taraka Rama Rao to join the Telugu Desam Party. He contested the position of mayor of Warangal Municipal Corporation. He served as Chairman for Kakatiya Urban Development Authority, Warangal in 1988. He was the District President for Telugu Desam Party in Warangal district from 1987-1994.

Srihari won a seat as a MLA from Station Ghanpur constituency in 1994. He served as a minister in the cabinet of Nandamuri Taraka Rama Rao, handling at various times the portfolios of Marketing, Social Welfare, Education and Irrigation in the Cabinets of both Nandamuri Taraka Rama Rao and Nara Chandrababu Naidu.

In 2004, Srihari lost the general election contest in Station Ghanpur to Dr. Vijaya Rama Rao of the Telangana Rashtra Samithi. He won a by-election from the same constituency in 2008.

He played a crucial role in getting the pro-Telangana letter from TDP party and also represented TDP in an all-party meeting held in New Delhi.

TRS

Srihari announced his resignation from the TDP at Warangal on 11 May 2013, expressing displeasure over the party's ambivalent stand on the Telangana statehood issue. He formally joined the TRS, which supported statehood for the Telangana region, on 15 May 2013. He served as the Member of Parliament from Warangal Parliamentary Constituency and later took oath as a cabinet minister in Telangana government on 25 January 2015 as a Deputy Chief Minister and Education Minister.

He is a Politburo member in the TRS state committee and also Chairman of training classes programmer for Telangana cadre. He is the chairman of TRS manifesto committee and played a crucial role in representing the aspirations of various sectors of people.

With his vast experience as a minister in the past, he was chosen as deputy chief minister and education minister of the state of Telangana.

On 11 June 2015, he resigned as Member of Parliament as he was offered a ministry in Telangana government because he was elected as MLC (Member of the legislative council).

Positions held
 Minister for Irrigation 
 Minister for Social Welfare
 Minister for Education
 Minister for Marketing
 Minister for Education
 Deputy CM

Political statistics

References

External links
 Telangana State: Live NEWS Updates
 Shri. Kadiyam Srihari Profile

1952 births
Living people
Telangana Rashtra Samithi politicians
Lok Sabha members from Telangana
India MPs 2014–2019
People from Hanamkonda district
Deputy chief ministers of Telangana
Members of the Telangana Legislative Council
Telugu Desam Party politicians